Marion Barber may refer to:

Marion Barber Jr. (born 1959), American football running back for the New York Jets from 1982–1988
Marion Barber III (1983–2022), American football running back for the Dallas Cowboys and Chicago Bears from 2005–2011